That's Fairly Interesting was a New Zealand TV series showcasing quirky people and events.

Its title was reference to the American show That's Incredible!. The Company that produced the programme was Communicado - owned by Neil Roberts, Murray Roberts, Garry McAlpine, and Robyn Scholes.  Communicado produced TV shows, advertisements, and films, including 'Once Were Warriors'.
The programms's reporters included Phil Keoghan, who later became famous for hosting the US show The Amazing Race.

Link
 Segment on Pat's Uninteresting Tours (July 1988) via YouTube
http://www.nzonscreen.com/person/neil-roberts/biography

References

New Zealand reality television series